The Edward River is a river located in Far North Queensland, Australia.

The headwaters of the river rise in the Curlew Range in the Great Dividing Range and flow in a westerly direction. The river flows across mostly uninhabited plains country and discharges into the Gulf of Carpentaria. The mouth of the Edward River is located on the western shore of Cape York Peninsula, the eastern edge of the Gulf of Carpentaria. The river descends  over its  course.

The river was named by the surveyor, John Thomas Embley, in 1884 after his brother Dr Edward Henry Embley who worked as an anaesthetist in Melbourne.

See also

References

Rivers of Far North Queensland
Gulf of Carpentaria